The Condor-class gunvessel was a class of four Royal Navy composite gunvessels of 3 guns, built between 1876 and 1877. They were all hulked or sold before 1893, giving them an active life of less than 15 years.

Construction

Design
Designed by Nathaniel Barnaby, the Royal Navy Director of Naval Construction, the hull was of composite construction; that is, iron keel, frames, stem and stern posts with wooden planking.

Propulsion
They were fitted with three boilers, a 2-cylinder horizontal compound expansion steam engine and a single screw. Griffon and Falcon were engined by Laird Brothers and had a feathering propeller. Flamingo and Condor were engined by John Elder & Co, and all ships had a designed 
, developing about  under power.

Sail plan
The class was rigged with three masts, with square rig on the fore- and main-masts, making them barque-rigged vessels.

Armament
The ships of the class were fitted with a 7-in (4½-ton) muzzle-loading rifle and two 64-pounder (64cwt) muzzle-loading rifles, except for Flamingo, which had two 20-pounder breech-loaders in place of one of the 64-pounder muzzle-loading rifles.  In 1884 Flamingo and Griffon were rearmed with two 5-in Vavasseur breech loaders replacing the 7-in muzzle-loading rifle.

Ships

References

External links

 
 C
Gunboat classes